Bakul Kayastha (born c. 1400) was a mathematician from Kamrup. He was especially known for his masterpiece in the field of mathematics named Kitabat Manjari, written in 1434, and Lilavati.

Kitabat Manjari is a poetical treatise on arithmetic, surveying and bookkeeping. The book teaches how accounts are to be kept under different heads and how stores belonging to the royal treasury are to be classified and entered into a stock book. 
The works of Bakul Kayastha were regarded as standards in his time to be followed by other Kayasthas (Kalitas) in maintaining royal accounts.

See also
 Bhattadeva
 Hema Saraswati

References

15th-century births
1450s deaths
15th-century Indian mathematicians
Kamrupi people
Scientists from Assam
Scholars from Assam